This is a list of past and current anime that aired on NHK.

TV series (current)

TV series (all)

1970s–90s

2000s

2010s

2020s

NHK original programming
NHK
NHK